The Roman Catholic Diocese of Pyay (Lat: Diocesis Pyayensis) is a suffragan diocese of the Latin Church of the Roman Catholic Church in Burma, in the ecclesiastical province of the Metropolitan Roman Catholic Archdiocese of Yangon (Rangoon), but like that depends on the missionary Roman Congregation for the Evangelization of Peoples.

Its Cathedral episcopal see is St. Paul’s Cathedral, in Pyay, Bago Region.

Statistics 
As per 2014, it pastorally served 25,810 Catholics (0.3% of 9,889,000 total) on 80,938 km² in 20 parishes and 1 mission with 40 priests (39 diocesan, 1 religious), 110 lay religious (5 brothers, 105 sisters) and 13 seminarians.

History 
Originally erected on 9 July 1940 as the Apostolic prefecture of Akyab, the pre-diocese has the distinction of being the only ecclesiastical jurisdiction in Burma created from the Diocese of Chittagong (in Bengal, now Metropolitan; by La Salette Fathers (M.S.) mission).

On 19 September 1957, its name was changed to the Apostolic prefecture of Prome.

On 21 February 1961, the prefecture was elevated to a full bishopric as Diocese of Prome.

Finally on 8 October 1991, the diocese was renamed the Diocese of Pyay and became a suffragan of the Archdiocese of Yangon

The resignation for health reasons of Auxiliary Bishop Gregory Taik Maung, appointed in 1991, who was serving as Apostolic Administrator, was accepted by Pope Benedict XVI on Friday, July 16, 2010. On Friday, December 3, 2010, Pope Benedict XVI accepted the resignation of Bishop Joseph Devellerez Thaung Shwe as Bishop and appointed Burmese priest Alexander Pyone Cho, a native of the Pyay Diocese (on loan "fidei donum" to the Roman Catholic Diocese of Salina, Kansas, USA), as Bishop of Pyay.

Ordinaries 
(all Roman Rite, till 2010 foreign members of a Latin missionary congregation)

Apostolic Prefect of Akyab 
 Thomas Albert Newman, M.S † (12 July 1940 - 2 October 1975 resigned see below) born USA

Apostolic Prefect of Prome 
 Thomas Albert Newman, M.S. † (see above 2 October 1975 - 1961.02.21 see below)

Suffragan Bishops of Prome 
 Thomas Albert Newman, M.S. † (see above 1961.02.21 - resigned 1975), died 1978
 Joseph Devellerez Thaung Shwe (2 October 1975 - 3 December 2010 resigned), died 2015
 Auxiliary Bishop Gregory Taik Maung (1984.11.08 – 2010.07.16 )
Apostolic Administrator sede plena the above Gregory Taik Maung (1991 – 2010.07.16 resigned because of ill health); the diocese was overseen from July 2010 to December 2010 by a neighboring Archbishop 
 Alexander Pyone Cho (3 December 2010 - ... ), no previous prelature.

See also 
 Catholic Church in Burma

References

Sources and external links 
 GCatholic

Roman Catholic dioceses in Burma
Religious organizations established in 1940
Roman Catholic dioceses and prelatures established in the 20th century